The Former Foreign YMCA Building is an historic building in Shanghai's Huangpu District, in China.

References

External links

 

Buildings and structures in Shanghai
Huangpu District, Shanghai